Stemshaug is a village in Aure Municipality in Møre og Romsdal county, Norway.  The village is located on the mainland along the southern shore of the Torsetsundet strait and along the Norwegian County Road 364. The village of Stemshaug was the administrative centre of the old Stemshaug Municipality. The very old Stemshaug Church is located in the village.

References

Aure, Norway
Villages in Møre og Romsdal